Roxburgh County was one of the original Nineteen Counties in New South Wales and is now one of the 141 Cadastral divisions of New South Wales. It includes the area to the north east of Bathurst, lying to the north and east of the Fish River to the junction of the Turon River. It includes Sofala. The Gudgegong River is the border to the north.

Roxburgh County named after the Scottish county of the same name. It was named in 1829.

Parishes within this county
A full list of parishes found within this county; their current LGA and mapping coordinates to the approximate centre of each location is as follows:

References

Counties of New South Wales